Pontinia is a comune (municipality) in the Province of Latina in the Italian region Lazio, located about  southeast of Rome and about  southeast of Latina.

Pontinia was established in 1935, as part of the project under Prime Minister Benito Mussolini which drained the Pontine Marshes and converted them to agriculture. The town plan was designed by engineer Alfredo Pappalardo, an employee of the Opera Nazionale Combattenti, the agency which oversaw the engineering works and settlement of the Pontine Marshes.

Pontinia borders the following municipalities: Latina, Priverno, Sabaudia, Sezze, Sonnino, Terracina.

Twin cities
 Utena, Lithuania
 Vittoria, Italy
 Goro, Italy

References

Cities and towns in Lazio
Italian fascist architecture
Planned cities in Italy